The Basketball competitions in the 1970 Summer Universiade were held in Torino, Italy.

Men's competition

Final standings

Women's competition

Final standings

External links
https://web.archive.org/web/20100116184925/http://sports123.com/bsk/wun.html
https://web.archive.org/web/20100116184920/http://sports123.com/bsk/mun.html

Basketball
Summer Universiade
1970
Universiade